Highland Park is a suburb of Auckland, New Zealand, located between Howick and Pakuranga. It belongs to the Pakuranga electorate which is currently represented by Simeon Brown.

Demographics

Highland Park had a population of 4,512 at the 2018 New Zealand census, an increase of 234 people (5.5%) since the 2013 census, and an increase of 321 people (7.7%) since the 2006 census. There were 1,575 households, comprising 2,163 males and 2,352 females, giving a sex ratio of 0.92 males per female. The median age was 40.3 years (compared with 37.4 years nationally), with 699 people (15.5%) aged under 15 years, 936 (20.7%) aged 15 to 29, 2,001 (44.3%) aged 30 to 64, and 873 (19.3%) aged 65 or older.

Ethnicities were 47.9% European/Pākehā, 4.5% Māori, 4.1% Pacific peoples, 45.1% Asian, and 4.4% other ethnicities. People may identify with more than one ethnicity.

The percentage of people born overseas was 56.3, compared with 27.1% nationally.

Although some people chose not to answer the census's question about religious affiliation, 44.7% had no religion, 38.4% were Christian, 0.2% had Māori religious beliefs, 2.9% were Hindu, 1.5% were Muslim, 3.5% were Buddhist and 3.1% had other religions.

Of those at least 15 years old, 1,083 (28.4%) people had a bachelor's or higher degree, and 498 (13.1%) people had no formal qualifications. The median income was $28,800, compared with $31,800 nationally. 576 people (15.1%) earned over $70,000 compared to 17.2% nationally. The employment status of those at least 15 was that 1,857 (48.7%) people were employed full-time, 486 (12.7%) were part-time, and 114 (3.0%) were unemployed.

References

External links
Photographs of Highland Park held in Auckland Libraries' heritage collections.

Suburbs of Auckland
Howick Local Board Area